Jack Stratton may refer to:

 Jack Stratton (musician), musician with Vulfpeck
 Jack Stratton (rugby union) (born 1994), New Zealand rugby union player